Holy Trinity Church (sometimes Church of the Holy Trinity or Sunderland Parish Church) is an Anglican church building in Sunderland, Tyne and Wear formerly the area's parish church. It was opened in 1719 as the church for the newly created Parish of Sunderland, and served the local community until dwindling numbers forced its closure in 1988. It has since been in the ownership of the Churches Conservation Trust who have preserved the space and converted it into a community cultural hub.

History

Origins
In 1712, with the port of Sunderland growing rapidly, the local St. Michael's church at Bishopwearmouth was rapidly becoming too small to serve the growing population. Some local merchants came together and started an appeal to build a new church in the east end of the city, and a site on the town moor was chosen.

Because of the rapid growth of the population, it was also decided that a new parish should be created, and on 9 March 1719 an act of parliament was passed to create the Parish of Sunderland (thus the church is sometimes referred to as Sunderland Parish Church). The Bishop of Durham of the time, Nathaniel Crew gave his consent, as did Reverend James Bowes D.D.

Design

The architect of the original church is not known for certain, although there are reports of involvement from William Eddy (a well-known local architect) and Daniel Newcombe, who would be appointed the first rector of the church.

The building itself has a Baroque style, brick built and with stone mouldings surrounding the doors and windows. The original building was without apse, although this would later be added (see below), and from the outside is described by Whellan as "plain and unprepossessing".

Inside, the building is described by Whellan as "handsome", with the aisles of pews being separated from the central nave by seven pillars on each side, each being capped with a corinthian-style capital. His full description reads:

Opening
Following the start of groundwork in 1718, the church building was completed the next year, such that on 5 September 1719 the consecration of the premises took place; prior to this, however, on 2 June 1719, the first recorded marriage took place at the church, of Jonathan Chambers and Elizabeth Hutchinson.

1700s

In 1735, Daniel Newcombe, the rector of the church who almost certainly had been involved in the original design of the building, decided to add an apse to the eastern end. This would give the building a chancel, which it had lacked until this point. The apse was large, near circular, and featuring a large venetian window; it still stands as part of the building today. Newcombe paid for the extension with his own money.

1800s
The church started the nineteenth century with a new roof in 1803, which included its raising so that a new gallery could be added. The windows were reglazed in the same year.

In 1854 the last burial in the graveyard took place.

A Venetian stained-glass window was added to the east side of the church in 1857. Manufactured by James Hartley's glassworks in Sunderland, it depicts the Ascension.

Jack Crawford Memorial

Jack Crawford, the "Hero of Camperdown", was a sailor aboard HMS Venerable in 1797, during the Battle of Camperdown. Venerable took fire damaging its mast, which lowered the flag of Admiral Duncan - recognised as the sign of surrender - so Crawford scaled the remnants of the mast and nailed the Admiral's flag back to the top.

Crawford was well celebrated for his act of heroism, and the people of Sunderland awarded him a silver star. In the coming years, however, he fell into poverty and was killed by a cholera outbreak in 1831.

In 1888, Holy Trinity Church erected a headstone in its graveyard in his honour.This was followed two years later by a statue of commemoration in Mowbray Park.

1900s
The 1900s started with the church being re-glazed, before community life began to degrade and the number of churchgoers in the east end of Sunderland diminished.

Closure
The congregation continued to diminish throughout the 20th century, until on 26 June 1988 the church was forced to close, and transferred to the Redundant Churches Fund (now known as the Churches Conservation Trust). The building itself needed extensive and costly repairs, and indeed to this day the Trust are still undertaking repairs.

The nearby church caretaker's cottage (formerly Donnison School, which closed at some point between 1905-1910) was Grade II listed in 1978, and became the Donnison School Heritage and Education Centre in 2007.

Present day

No longer in use as a place of worship, the building these days goes by the name of The Canny Space, a community venue and cultural arts centre. Restoration work is still underway, with most of the money being fundraised; as of 2015, £1,341,014 had been raised towards the project.

The project's Creative Director role has been filled by noted local musician Dave Stewart, former member of Eurythmics.

See also

Grade I listed buildings in Tyne and Wear
List of churches preserved by the Churches Conservation Trust in Northern England

Notes

References

Churches in the City of Sunderland
Grade I listed churches in Tyne and Wear
Sunderland, Holy Trinity Church
Sunderland, Holy Trinity Church
Sunderland